Uroš Mirković may refer to:

Uroš Mirković (footballer), Serbian association football midfielder
Uroš Mirković (basketball), Serbian professional basketball player